Tony Williams may refer to:

Music 
Tony Williams (drummer) (1945–1997), American jazz drummer
Tony Williams (English musician) (born 1947), English bassist in Stealers Wheel and Jethro Tull
Tony Williams (singer) (1928–1992), American lead singer with The Platters
The World Famous Tony Williams, American R&B and soul singer

Sports 
Tony Williams (American football) (born 1975), former American football defensive tackle
Tony Williams (rugby league) (born 1988), Australian rugby league footballer
Tony Williams (swimmer) (born 1938), Sri Lankan Olympic swimmer
Tony Williams (soccer) (born 1976), retired American soccer player
Tony Williams (basketball) (born 1978), American basketball player
Tony Williams (boat racer) (born 1943), 1981 winner of the Formula 1 Powerboat World Grand Prix

Others 
Tony Williams (author), British poet and author
Tony Williams (politician) (1928–2012), Australian politician
Tony Williams (film executive), British film producer
A. A. B. Williams (1926–2016), known as Tony, South African civil engineer

See also
Toni Williams (1939–2016), New Zealand singer
Toni-Ann Williams (born 1995), Jamaican-American gymnast
Anthony Williams (disambiguation)